Baptist Medical Center may refer to:

 Baptist Medical Center, a hospital located in San Antonio, Texas
 Baptist Medical Center Beaches, a hospital located in Jacksonville, Florida
 Baptist Medical Center Jacksonville, a hospital located in Jacksonville, Florida
 Baptist Medical Center Nassau, a hospital located in Fernandina, Florida
 Baptist Medical Center South, a hospital located in Jacksonville, Florida
 Missouri Baptist Medical Center, a hospital in St. Louis, Missouri
 Ochsner Baptist Medical Center, a hospital in New Orleans, Louisiana
 Research Medical Center-Brookside Campus, a hospital in Kansas City, Missouri that was formally known as Baptist Medical Center
 Wake Forest Baptist Medical Center, an academic medical center located in Winston-Salem, North Carolina

Other uses
 Atlanta Medical Center, formerly known as Georgia Baptist Medical Center
 Baptist Health, a network of five hospitals, affiliated with over 50 primary care offices located throughout Northeast Florida and Southeast Georgia
 Baptist Health, a different network of nine hospitals, affiliated with over 250 primary care offices, with eight hospitals in Kentucky and one in the Indiana suburbs of Louisville 
 Baptist Health South Florida, a faith-based not-for-profit healthcare organization and clinical care network in southern Florida
 Baptist Health System, a health system in San Antonio, Texas
 Baptist Medical Center sex reassignment surgery controversy, a sex reassignment surgery controversy which occurred in 1977 in Oklahoma City, Oklahoma

See also
 Baptist Hospital (disambiguation)
 Baptist Memorial Hospital (disambiguation)